Deimatidae is a family of sea cucumbers belonging to the clade Synallactida.

Genera
The following genera are recognised in the family Deimatidae:
 Deima Théel, 1879
 Oneirophanta Théel, 1879
 Orphnurgus Théel, 1879

References

Synallactida